The Way It Has to Be is the first live album released by Australian singer Wendy Matthews recorded in Melbourne in May 1991, the album was released in October 1991.
Following the commercial and critical success of her album Émigré, Matthews assembled a touring band that included Paul Abrahams (bass), Robbie James (guitar), Michael King (guitar), Amanda Brown (oboe, violin), James Valentine (sax), Mark O'Connor (keyboards), Lisa Maxwell (backing vocals) and Mark Meyer (drums).

Track listing
	If You're Ready (Homer Banks, Raymond Jackson, Carl Hampton)
	As We Speak (Paul Abrahams, Robbie James)
	Token Angels (Roger Mason)
	I Didn't Take Your Man	
	Until You Say (Preston Glass, Nerada Walden)
	Bitter Fruit (Little Steven)
	Doomsday Lullaby (Danny Bruce Peck)	
	Take Your Time	
	Sweet Fire Of Love (Robbie Robertson, U2)

References

1991 live albums
Wendy Matthews albums